Assara microdoxa is a species of snout moth in the genus Assara. It was described by Edward Meyrick in 1879, and is known from Australia.

References

Moths described in 1879
Phycitini
Moths of Australia